Lilian Baylis Technology School (LBTS) is a secondary school for students from ages 11–19, in Kennington, London, England.

History
The school is named after Lilian Baylis (1874–1937), a theatrical producer and manager who lived nearby in Stockwell. The school was formed from an amalgamation of Beaufoy School with Vauxhall Manor School for Girls in 1983.

It was originally based in purpose-built 1960s school buildings at Lollard Street, Kennington before moving to the current premises on Kennington Lane in 2005. The 6th form LBTS6 opened its doors in September 2012.

Organisation
Headteacher: Karen Chamberlain.

Deputy Headteachers: Jason McInnis and Su Wardrop.

The school has a house system. Each student and teacher is put in one of 4 houses. These are Sapphire Sharks, Ruby Bears, Emerald Crocs and Amber Lions.

References

External links
 

Secondary schools in the London Borough of Lambeth
Community schools in the London Borough of Lambeth